Liegos is a locality located in the municipality of Acebedo, in León province, Castile and León, Spain. As of 2020, it has a population of 44.

Geography 
Liegos is located 112km northeast of León.

References

Populated places in the Province of León